Pokrvenik is a village northwest of Lake Prespa in the Resen Municipality of the Republic of North Macedonia.

Demographics
With the exception of 1981, Pokrvenik's population has declined in every census since 1961 and 2021.

References

Villages in Resen Municipality